Effect Radio is a network of radio stations airing a Christian Rock format. The network is owned by The River Christian Fellowship, formerly Calvary Chapel of Twin Falls, Idaho. It's a sister network to the more widely distributed CSN International. Current Effect Radio DJ's and Radio Personalities are AJ Kestler & Ryan D Downs.

Stations
Effect Radio has 63 stations. The network's flagship station is KEFX in Twin Falls, Idaho.

Full Powered Stations

Notes:

Low Powered Translators
In addition to its full powered stations, Effect Radio is relayed by an additional 55 translators.

References

External links
 Effect Radio website

1996 establishments in Idaho
American radio networks
Christian radio stations in the United States
Radio stations established in 1996